Portora may refer to:

Portora Royal School in Enniskillen, County Fermanagh, Northern Ireland
Portora Castle in Enniskillen, County Fermanagh, Northern Ireland